Foster House may refer to:

Foster House (Union Springs, Alabama)
Foster House (420 South Spruce Street, Hope, Arkansas)
Foster House (303 North Hervey Street, Hope, Arkansas)

See also
Foster Home/Sylvan Plantation, Tuscaloosa, Alabama, listed on the National Register of Historic Places (NRHP) in Tuscaloosa County
C.E. Foster House, Mena, Arkansas
Foster-Buell Estate, Cherry Hills Village, Colorado, listed on the NRHP in Arapahoe County
Ernest LeNeve Foster House, Denver, Colorado, listed on the NRHP in Denver County
Blacky Foster House, Shoup, Idaho, listed on the NRHP in Idaho County
Foster Hall (Indianapolis, Indiana), listed on the NRHP in Marion County
Foster/Bell House, Ottumwa, Iowa, listed on the NRHP in Wapello County
Herman B. Foster House, Gardner, Kansas, listed on the NRHP in Johnson County
J.E. Foster House, Jennings, Louisiana, listed on the NRHP in Jefferson Davis Parish
Foster Family Home, Newry, Maine
William Foster House, Andover, Massachusetts, listed on the NRHP in Essex County
Phineas Foster House, Boxford, Massachusetts, listed on the NRHP in Essex County
Gen. Gideon Foster House, Peabody, Massachusetts, listed on the NRHP in Essex County
Samuel Foster House, Reading, Massachusetts, listed on the NRHP in Middlesex County
Alexander Foster House, Somerville, Massachusetts, listed on the NRHP in Middlesex County
Walter K. Foster House, Stoneham, Massachusetts, listed on the NRHP in Middlesex County
Stephen Foster House (Topsfield, Massachusetts), listed on the NRHP in Essex County
Foster-Fair House, Louisville, Mississippi, listed on the NRHP in Winston County
Reuben Foster House and Perley Cleaves House, Concord, New Hampshire
Foster–Armstrong House, Montague Township, New Jersey, listed on the NRHP in Sussex County
Foster Hall (Las Cruces, New Mexico), listed on the NRHP in Doña Ana County
Dr. Charles A. Foster House, Glens Falls, New York, listed on the NRHP in Warren County
Foster-Gram House, Put-In-Bay, Ohio, listed on the NRHP in Ottawa County
Moss-Foster House, Sandusky, Ohio, listed on the NRHP in Erie County
Claud Foster House, Willowick, Ohio, listed on the NRHP in Lake County
Philip Foster Farm, Eagle Creek, Oregon, listed on the NRHP in Clackamas County
Foster-Payne House, Pawtucket, Rhode Island, listed on the NRHP in Providence County
Foster Ranch House, Chance, South Dakota, listed on the NRHP in Perkins County
Susie Foster Log House, Smithville, Tennessee, listed on the NRHP in DeKalb County
Eldred W. Foster House, Fort Worth, Texas, listed on the NRHP in Tarrant County
Foster House (Navasota, Texas), listed on the NRHP in Grimes County
Anderson-Foster House, Holly Grove, Virginia